Balathi  ( بلھتی ) is a village in Dadyal tehsil, Mirpur District, Azad Kashmir, Pakistan. It has  an approximate population of 6,000. The area is mainly agricultural.

Populated places in Mirpur District